Mason Mingus (born November 28, 1994) is an American professional stock car racing driver who competes part-time in the ARCA Menards Series East, driving the No. 11 for Fast Track Racing, as well as part-time in the ARCA/CRA Super Series, driving the No. 5 Toyota Camry for Wauters Motorsports.

Racing career

Early career
Mingus began his racing career in 2002, competing in quarter midget competition, moving up to the MMRA Mini Cup Series in 2005 and the MMRA Baby Grand Series in 2008, winning the series championship. In 2009 he joined the Ken-Ten Pro Late Model Series, finishing eighth in series points; he returned to the series in 2010 and won the circuit's championship.

In 2011 he moved to the Champion Racing Association CRA Super Series, competing in that series in 2011 and 2012; he also made his ARCA Racing Series debut in 2011, driving for Win-Tron Racing at Salem Speedway. He returned with the team for a limited schedule in 2012 in addition to the full CRA Super Series schedule; he shuffled his racing career with football obligations, qualifying for the All-American 400 in October on the same day as a playoff football game.

ARCA and NASCAR

In 2013, Mingus competed full-time in the ARCA Racing Series, finishing second in series points behind champion Frank Kimmel. In October, following the end of the ARCA season, Mingus made his debut in NASCAR competition, driving for Win-Tron Racing in the Camping World Truck Series Fred's 250 at Talladega Superspeedway; he also planned to compete in races later in the season at Phoenix International Raceway and Homestead-Miami Speedway. He qualified 12th at Talladega in his debut, but finished last in the race after early engine issues. He also competed in races at Phoenix International Raceway and Homestead-Miami Speedway in November, posting a best finish of 22nd at Phoenix.

In January 2014, it was announced that Mingus would be competing in the Camping World Truck Series full-time in 2014 driving the No. 35 Toyota Tundra for Win-Tron Racing, running for Rookie of the Year. Mingus started the season being involved in a big one at Daytona, resulting in a 28th-place finish. Mingus then had a consistent finish in later races, until Win-Tron Racing parted ways with Mingus. Mingus was later offered a ride with Billy Boat Motorsports to drive for the remainder of the 2014 season.

On May 6, 2021, it was announced that Mingus would return to ARCA, driving at his home track of the Nashville Fairgrounds Speedway in the No. 11 for Fast Track Racing. This was his debut in the ARCA Menards Series East, which was previously the NASCAR K&N Pro Series East.

Personal life
Mingus was born in Louisville, Kentucky, but grew up in Brentwood, Tennessee. He is a graduate of Franklin Road Academy, where he competed in wrestling, track, and football.

Motorsports career results

NASCAR
(key) (Bold – Pole position awarded by qualifying time. Italics – Pole position earned by points standings or practice time. * – Most laps led.)

Xfinity Series

Camping World Truck Series

ARCA Menards Series
(key) (Bold – Pole position awarded by qualifying time. Italics – Pole position earned by points standings or practice time. * – Most laps led.)

ARCA Menards Series East

 Season still in progress 
 Ineligible for series points

References

External links
 
 

Living people
1994 births
People from Brentwood, Tennessee
Racing drivers from Nashville, Tennessee
Racing drivers from Tennessee
NASCAR drivers
ARCA Menards Series drivers
Racing drivers from Louisville, Kentucky
ARCA Midwest Tour drivers